Néstor Ayala Villagra (born 18 February 1983) is a Paraguayan football player who plays as a striker for San Martín de San Juan in the Primera División Argentina.

Career
Ayala began his professional footballing career playing for Sportivo Iteño in the Paraguayan third division. After playing well throughout the season, Ayala was offered trails to play for various clubs in the El Salvador's Primera División. Ayala had trails with various clubs but was ultimately signed by Once Lobos for the 2004 Clausura tournament. He spent one year with the Santa Ana club, before transferring to C.D. Atlético Balboa for the 2005 season. After having a solid year with Atlético Balboa, Ayala finished the 2005–06 Apertura championship as his team's top goalscorer and tied for second as the league's leading scorer. As a result of his consistently good performances, Ayala arose interest from some of El Salvador larger clubs, and ultimately signed a 3-year contract with Club Deportivo FAS for the 2006 Clausura tournament. Ayala had a successful first season with FAS, finishing top scorer for his team. He led FAS to finish second for the season and was a vital part of the team progressing to the final against C.D. Águila (a game they ultimately lost 4–2).

After that season there was talk of Ayala becoming nationalised as a Salvadoran and playing for the national team, along with his teammate Alejandro de la Cruz Bentos, Vista Hermosa's Patricio Barroche and A.D. Isidro Metapán's Rodrigo Lago.

For the 2006 Apertura Ayala once again began the season strong and was fast becoming a fan favourite. After his release, Ayala returned to Paraguay, where he signed with Sportivo Luqueño for the remainder of the season. There he was a part of Luqueño's championship winning team for that season. Ayala remained at the club for the 2006-07 Apertura tournament and was ultimately spotted by Argentina's Club Atlético Tigre.

Ayala transferred to Tigre for a reportedly 2,5 million transfer fee. He had solid performances with Tigre during his first season, one being against Argentine giants River Plate, when he netted 2 goals. Tigre eventually finished the 2007 Apertura in second place, the highest league finish in the club's history. Ayala made a contribution of 7 goals in 11 games.

Ayala left Tigre to join Ecuadorian Serie A's champion Deportivo Quito in July 2010. He scored 6 goals for Deportivo Quito during the second half of the 2010 Season.

On 1 February 2011, he officially agreed a 6-month contract with Deportivo Cuenca.

International career
Ayala was called up to the Paraguayan national side in a South American FIFA World Cup qualifier against Ecuador. Ayala played well, scoring a goal and assisting in another in Paraguay's 5–1 win.

International goals

|- bgcolor=#DFE7FF
| 1. || 18 November 2007 || Defensores del Chaco, Asuncion, Paraguay ||  || 4-1 || 5-1 || 2010 FIFA World Cup qualification
|}

References

External links
 
 Football-Lineups player profile
  Argentine Primera statistics

1983 births
Living people
Paraguayan footballers
Paraguay international footballers
Paraguayan expatriate footballers
Sportivo Luqueño players
Association football forwards
Atlético Balboa footballers
C.D. FAS footballers
Club Atlético Tigre footballers
S.D. Quito footballers
C.D. Cuenca footballers
Argentine Primera División players
Expatriate footballers in Argentina
Expatriate footballers in Ecuador
Expatriate footballers in El Salvador